Hank Thorns (born January 11, 1989) is an American professional basketball player who last played for the Cape Breton Highlanders of the National Basketball League of Canada (NBL). He played college basketball at Texas Christian University, after transferring from Virginia Tech in 2009.

College career 
Thorns played his first two seasons of college basketball at Virginia Tech. Thorns was among the top players in the Mountain West in 2011–12 as a senior at TCU. He earned a spot on the Mountain West Conference First Team in 2012, a year after a second team finish as a junior.

Professional career 
On September 25, 2013, he signed with the Los Angeles Clippers of the National Basketball Association (NBA). However, he was waived on October 25.

On December 24, 2012, Thorns signed with the Maine Red Claws. He was waived on February 7, 2013. Later that month, he signed with Mornar Bar of Montenegro and finished off the season with the team.

On October 25, 2016, Thorns signed with the Cape Breton Highlanders in the NBL Canada. Team manager Tyrone Levingston praised the signee, saying, "The point guard role is key to the success of any team, and I look forward to seeing what Hank is going to bring to that role."

Personal 
Thorns is the cousin of former Tennessee Volunteers basketball star and current NBA player C. J. Watson.

References

External links
 NBA D-League Profile
 Profile at Cstv.com
 Profile at RealGM.com
 Profile at Eurobasket.com

1989 births
Living people
American expatriate basketball people in Canada
American expatriate basketball people in Mexico
American expatriate basketball people in Montenegro
American men's basketball players
Basketball players from Nevada
Cape Breton Highlanders (basketball) players
KK Mornar Bar players
Maine Red Claws players
Ostioneros de Guaymas (basketball) players
Point guards
Sportspeople from Las Vegas
TCU Horned Frogs men's basketball players
Virginia Tech Hokies men's basketball players